Canoa Quebrada (meaning broken canoe in Portuguese), known as the pearl of the east coast of Ceará, Brazil, is an international tourist beach resort 164 km from Fortaleza, in the municipality of Aracati.

This small fishing village, among dunes and cliffs, has good views and is becoming popular with tourists. The main street of Canoa, where most accommodation, restaurants and shops are concentrated, is popularly known as 'Broadway, although its real name is "Rua Dragão do Mar" in honor of Francisco José do Nascimento, a hero of the abolitionist movement in Ceará, who in 1881 refused to transport slaves to be sold further south in the country.

The Tourism Authority of Ceará rates Canoa Quebrada as the most important tourist attraction of the state, after Fortaleza.

Tourist activities include outdoor activities such as excursions in dune buggies, horse riding, sailing in a 'jangada' boat, mountain biking, sandboarding, kitesurfing and windsurfing*.

The location is served by Dragão do Mar Airport, located near Aracati.

Weather
The region's climate is semi-arid. The average annual temperature is around 27 °C – with an average annual high of 38 °C, and a low of 21 °C. The sun is present almost all year long, with rain usually only between March and May.

City details

 State: Ceará
 Region: Northeast
 Population: 65,292 inhabitants (District of Aracati)
 AREA CODE: (88)

Distances
 Fortaleza: 
 Russas: 
 Mossoró: 
 Rio de Janeiro: 
 São Paulo:

References

External links

Beaches of Brazil